The United Kingdom of Great Britain and Northern Ireland competed as Great Britain at the 1984 Winter Paralympics in Innsbruck, Austria. Britain's twenty-two athletes competed in all three sports: cross-country skiing, alpine skiing and ice sledge speed racing. For the first time in its Winter Paralympic history, Britain won medals, albeit no gold; British athletes obtained four silver medals and six bronze - the country's best performance at the Winter Paralympics until they achieved their first gold medal in 2014, and still the best performance in terms of number of medals won.

Medallists

See also
Great Britain at the 1984 Winter Olympics

References

External links
International Paralympic Committee official website

Nations at the 1984 Winter Paralympics
1984
Paralympics
Winter sports in the United Kingdom